State Highway 15 (SH-15) is a state highway in Bihar state. It covers only one districts i.e. Rohtas district of Bihar state. This state highway starts from Nasriganj near Daudnagar and ends at NH-19 near Dehri-on-Sone. The Dehri-on-Sone is situated between Sasaram and Aurangabad.

Route
The route of SH-15 from north to south direction is as follows:

 Nasriganj
 Amiyawar
 Ayar Kotha (Rohtas)
 Makrain (Rohtas)

Note: 
 from Dehri-on-Sone, national highway NH-19 move west towards Sasaram.
 from Dehri-on-Sone, national highway NH-19 move east towards Aurangabad.

References 

State Highways in Bihar